Thomas Ustick Walter (September 4, 1804 – October 30, 1887) was an American architect of German descent, the dean of American architecture between the 1820 death of Benjamin Latrobe and the emergence of H.H. Richardson in the 1870s. He was the fourth Architect of the Capitol and responsible for adding the north (Senate) and south (House) wings and the central dome that is predominantly the current appearance of the U.S. Capitol building. Walter was one of the founders and second president of the American Institute of Architects. In 1839, he was elected as a member to the American Philosophical Society.

Early life
Born in 1804 in Philadelphia, Walter was the son of mason and bricklayer Joseph S. Walter and his wife Deborah. Walter was a mason's apprentice to his father. He also studied architecture and technical drawing at the Franklin Institute.

Walter received early training in a variety of fields including masonry, mathematics, physical science, and the fine arts. At 15, Walter entered the office of William Strickland, studying architecture and mechanical drawing, then established his own practice in 1830.

Works

Professional career 

 Spruce Street Baptist Church, 418 Spruce St., Philadelphia, Pennsylvania (1829)
 Portico Row, 900–930 Spruce St., Philadelphia (1831–32)
 Moyamensing Prison, Philadelphia (1832–35)
 First Presbyterian Church of West Chester, West Chester, Pennsylvania (1832)
 Wills Eye Hospital, Logan Square, Philadelphia (1832)
 Founder's Hall, Girard College for Orphans, Philadelphia (1833–1848) 
 Expansion of Andalusia, Bensalem Township, Pennsylvania (1833–32)
 St. George's Hall, residence of Matthew Newkirk (1835)
 Interior renovation of Christ Church, Philadelphia, (1835–36)
 Bank of Chester County, West Chester, Pa. (1836)
 West Chester Young Ladies Seminary, West Chester (1838)
 Newkirk Viaduct Monument, West Philadelphia, Philadelphia (1839)
 St. James Episcopal Church, Wilmington, North Carolina (1839–40)
 Norfolk Academy Norfolk, Virginia (1840)
 Lexington Presbyterian Church, Lexington, Virginia (1843)
 Breakwater, La Guaira, Venezuela (1843-45)
 Chapel of the Cross, Chapel Hill, North Carolina (1843)
 Tabb Street Presbyterian Church, Petersburg, Virginia  (1843)
 Winder Houses, 232-34 S. 3rd St., Philadelphia (1843)
 Chester County Courthouse, West Chester (1846–47)
 Chester County Horticultural Hall, West Chester (1848)
 Inglewood Cottage, Chestnut Hill, Philadelphia

As Architect of the Capitol 

 Completion of East Wing, Old Patent Office Building, Washington, D.C. (–1853)
 West Wing, Old Patent Office Building, Washington, D.C. (1851–54, burned 1877)
 United States Capitol dome, Washington, D.C. (1855–1866)
 Preliminary design for expansion of the Treasury Building, Washington, D.C.
 Expansion of the General Post Office, Washington, D.C. (1855–66)
 Marine Barracks, Pensacola, Florida (1857)
 Marine Barracks, Brooklyn, New York (1858–59)

Late career 

 Ingleside, Washington, D.C.
 Garrett-Dunn House, 7048 Germantown Ave, Mt. Airy, Philadelphia (burned 2009)
 Fifth Presbyterian Church, 500 I Street N.W., Washington, D.C. (1852)
 Thomas Ustick Walter House, Germantown, Philadelphia (1860–61, demolished )
 Eutaw Place Baptist Church, Baltimore, Maryland (1868–71)

It has been suggested that Walter designed the Second Empire-styled Quarters B and Quarters D at Admiral's Row in Brooklyn, New York.

The U.S. Capitol and its dome

The most famous of Walter's constructions is the dome of the U.S. Capitol. By 1850, the rapid expansion of the United States, and thus the U.S. Congress, had caused a space shortage in the Capitol. Walter was selected to design extensions for the Capitol. His plan more than doubled the size of the existing building and added the familiar cast-iron dome.

There were at least six draftsmen in Walter's office, headed by Walter's chief assistant, August Schoenborn, a German immigrant who had learned his profession from the ground up. It appears that he was responsible for some of the fundamental ideas in the Capitol structure. These included the curved arch ribs and an ingenious arrangement used to cantilever the base of the columns. This made it appear that the diameter of the base exceeded the actual diameter of the foundation, thereby enlarging the proportions of the total structure.

Construction on the wings began in 1851 and proceeded rapidly; the House of Representatives met in its new quarters in December 1857 and the Senate occupied its new chamber by January 1859. Walter's fireproof cast iron dome was authorized by Congress on March 3, 1855, and was nearly completed by December 2, 1863, when the Statue of Freedom was placed on top. The dome's cast iron frame was supplied and constructed by the iron foundry Janes, Fowler, Kirtland & Co. He also reconstructed the interior of the west center building for the Library of Congress after the fire of 1851. Walter continued as Capitol architect until 1865, when he resigned his position over a minor contract dispute. After 14 years in Washington, he retired to his native Philadelphia.

In the 1870s, financial setbacks forced Walter to come out of retirement, and he worked as second-in-command when his friend and younger colleague John McArthur, Jr., won the design competition for Philadelphia City Hall. He continued on that vast project until his death in 1887. He was interred at Laurel Hill Cemetery in Philadelphia.

Other honors
For their architectural accomplishments, both Walter and Benjamin Latrobe are honored in a ceiling mosaic in the East Mosaic Corridor at the entrance to the Main Reading Room of the Library of Congress.

Walter's grandson, Thomas Ustick Walter III, was also an architect; he practiced in Birmingham, Alabama, from the 1890s to the 1910s.

Gallery

See also
Old Patent Office Building
1877 U. S. Patent Office fire

References

External links
Aoc.gov file
Brief biography of Thomas Ustick Walter
Walter's drawings at the Atheneum of Philadelphia
 The Winterthur Library Overview of an archival collection on Thomas Ustick Walter.
Library of Congress, Jefferson Building East Corridor mosaics
Old Patent Office Building video

1804 births
1887 deaths
Architects from Philadelphia
Fellows of the American Institute of Architects
American people of German descent
Architects of the United States Capitol
Greek Revival architects
Presidents of the American Institute of Architects
19th-century American architects
Burials at Laurel Hill Cemetery (Philadelphia)